William Schenck may refer to:

A. William Schenck, former Secretary of the Pennsylvania Department of Banking
William Cortenus Schenck (1773–1821), surveyor, militia general and legislator in Ohio